The Right Alternative (AD) is a right-wing political party in Romania. It was founded and registered on 9 August 2019.

The Right Alternative is a member of the European Conservatives and Reformists (ECR) party.

References

External links 
  

Conservative parties in Romania
European Conservatives and Reformists member parties
Political parties established in 2015
Registered political parties in Romania
2015 establishments in Romania
Nationalist parties in Romania
Eurosceptic parties in Romania
Right-wing parties in Romania